Al-Nurayn Mosque is a modern mosque in Qusra, West Bank, Palestine. It gained attention in September 2011 when it became the target of an arson attack allegedly perpetrated by militant Jewish settlers.

Arson attack

The mosque was significantly damaged in an overnight arson attack on 5 September 2011, which took place at approximately 3:00 am local time (GMT+2). Two burning tyres were thrown through broken windows on the ground floor; the fire and vandalism were discovered by worshippers arriving for prayers later in the morning. Words in Hebrew had been graffitied on the walls, and included hateful incites against Muhammad and threats of further attacks.

The attack is believed to have been perpetrated by militant Jewish settlers in retaliation for the demolitions in Migron. These had been ordered by Israel's supreme court in August in response to a pleading from Peace Now on the grounds that they were built on privately owned land. Newspapers, as well as Rabbis for Human Rights, reported that the attack on the mosque was apparently part of the notorious "price tag policy" of certain factions amongst settlers. Palestinian security authorities claimed this to be the sixth mosque in two years attacked by settlers in the West Bank. Israeli police began an investigation into the incident the following day. According to the United Nations, it is one of more than 250 incidents involving settlers in 2011 in which Palestinians were injured or their property was damaged.

The Palestinian National Authority condemned the attack, pointing out that this was just one of several incidents of violent crime perpetrated by settlers in the West Bank. Prime Minister Fayyad argued that such attacks incite a cycle of violence and labelled it an act of terrorism. He was critical of the Israeli police and called on the Middle East Quartet to investigate the matter instead. The European Union's foreign policy chief Catherine Ashton released a statement saying, "Attacks against places of worship undermine the freedom of religion or belief which is a fundamental human right." She argued that incitements such as this were undermining the peace process by fostering distrust between the parties involved. The Secretary-General of the Organisation of Islamic Cooperation (OIC), Ekmeleddin Ihsanoglu, also condemned the attack, holding Israel fully responsible. He asked that human rights organisations work to prevent further acts of violence against Palestinians.

See also
 List of mosques in Israel and the Palestinian territories

References

Mosques in the West Bank
Terrorist incidents in the West Bank in 2011
2011 in the Palestinian territories
Zionist terrorism